The 2020 Portland Timbers season is the 34th season in their existence and the 10th season for the Portland Timbers in Major League Soccer (MLS), the top-flight professional soccer league in the United States and Canada.

Background

Season review by month

Off season
On October 29, Portland re-signed midfielder Sebastián Blanco to a multiyear contract where he will remain a Designated Player.

On October 31, forward Jeremy Ebobisse was called up to the U.S. Men's National Team pre-camp.

On November 6, Andy Polo was called up by Peru for friendlies against Colombia and Chile. Renzo Zambrano was called up by Venezuela for a friendly against Japan on November 19.  Bill Tuiloma was called up by New Zealand for friendlies against the Republic of Ireland on November 14 and Lithuania on November 17. Jorge Moreira was called up for Paraguay for friendlies against Bulgaria on November 14 and Saudi Arabia on November 19.

On November 15, MLS cut Portland forward, Brian Fernández, since he failed to comply with the league's Substance Abuse and Behavioral Health (SABH) Program.

On November 19, Nashville SC selected left-back Zarek Valentin as the fourth overall pick in the 2019 MLS Expansion Draft.  Portland will receive $50,000 in General Allocation Money for the selection.

On November 20, Portland signed Croatian center-back Dario Župarić from Prva HNL side, HNK Rijeka. He will occupy an international slot on the Timbers roster.

On November 21, Portland announced its 2020 initial roster changes.  Portland declined options on goalkeeper Kendall McIntosh, defender Modou Jadama and forward Foster Langsdorf.  Claude Dielna is out of contract.  Portland also did not exercise the 2020 contract option for midfielder Diego Valeri; however, remain in discussions with him.

On December 6, midfielder Marvin Loría was called up by the Costa Rica U-23. The team will play two friendly matches against Costa Rica First Division teams in preparation for the 2020 CONCACAF Men's Olympic Qualifying Championship.

On December 9, Portland announced they would re-sign Edgar "RCTID_Thiago" Guerrer for the 2020 eMLS season.  This marks his third year with the club, participating in all eMLS competitions since its inauguration in 2018.

On December 10, forward Jeremy Ebobisse underwent a minor procedure to repair a meniscus tear that was sustained last month while on duty with the U.S. U-23 Men's National Team.  He is expected to return to action in time for the start of preseason.

On December 16, Portland announced the multiyear contract extension for Argentine midfielder, Diego Valeri.  He was signed using Targeted Allocation Money (TAM) and will no longer use a Designated Player (DP) slot.

On December 19, MLS reviled the full MLS season schedule. Later that day, Portland announced the contract extension of Bill Tuiloma.

On December 20, Portland goalkeeper Steve Clark signed a new contract with the club.

On January 2, Portland announced the signing of Colombian right winger, Yimmi Chará.  He will occupy a Designated Player and International Roster Slot.  He is the younger brother of center defensive midfielder, Diego Chará.

On January 9, Portland selected Irish midfielder, Aaron Molloy from Penn State as the 16th overall 2020 MLS Super Draft pick. Portland traded their second round pick to D.C. United on January 23, 2019.  Later that day, Edgar "RCTID_Thiago" Guerrero finished in 12th place out of the 25 single team table.  He was unable to qualify for the playoffs.  His 2020 eMLS League Series One record was 4-5-3 (15 points).

On January 13, Portland selected American defender, Zachery McGraw from Army as the 68th overall 2020 MLS Super Draft pick.  Shortly after, Portland selected Norwegian defender, Joergen Oland from Fordham.  He was the 94th overall pick for the 2020 MLS Super Draft.

Preseason
On January 20, players reported for their first day of training for the upcoming 2020 MLS campaign.

On January 21, Portland announced the details of their Costa Rica preseason travel.  Portland will face Saprissa on Saturday, February  1, Municipal Grecia on Wednesday, February 5, and C.S. Herediano on Sunday, February 9.

On January 22, Portland midfielder Andrés Flores underwent surgery to repair medial meniscus tear.  He is expected to return in 4 to 6 weeks.

On January 23, Portland signed midfielder Blake Bodily as a Homegrown Player for the 2020 season.

On January 30, Portland signed Polish striker Jarosław Niezgoda from Polish Ekstraklasa side Legia Warsaw. He will occupy a Designated Player and International Roster Slot.

On January 31, Portland signed Chilean striker Felipe Mora on loan for one year from Liga MX side Pumas UNAM. He will occupy an International Roster Slot.

On February 1, Portland defeated Saprissa 2–1 in Costa Rica.  Goals were scored by Diego Valeri in the 9th minute and Timbers 2 newcomer, Ken Krolicki in the 77th minute.

On February 5, Portland defeated Municipal Grecia 3–1 in Costa Rica.  Felipe Mora (assisted by: Sebastián Blanco) scored in the 17th minute while Eryk Williamson captured a brace with goals in the 59th and 65th minute. Later that day, Portland released their 2020–21 secondary kit.

On February 6, Portland announced the completed transfer of Cristhian Paredes who was on loan to the Timbers from Liga MX side, Club América.

On February 9, Portland defeated Herediano 3–0 in Costa Rica in four 30 minute sessions.  Goals were scored by Felipe Mora (assisted by: Diego Valeri and Sebastián Blanco) in the 58th minute, Dairon Asprilla
(assisted by: Renzo Zambrano) in the 103rd minute, and an own goal in the 118th minute by an unnamed player.  This finishes Portland's preseason campaign in Costa Rica.

On February 11, Portland received $150,000 in General Allocation Money (GAM) from the Montreal Impact in exchange for a 2020 international roster slot.

On February 16, Portland started their 2020 home preseason tournament with a victory against Vancouver Whitecaps FC.  The final score was 2–1 with goals scored by Diego Valeri (penalty kick) in the 34th minute and Andy Polo (assisted by: Diego Valeri) in the 46th minute.

On February 19, Portland was defeated by Minnesota United FC with a final score of 2–4.  Goals for Portland were scored by Dairon Asprilla (assisted by: Tomás Conechny) in the 29th minute and Ken Krolicki in the 85th minute.  Ken Krolicki plays for Timbers 2.

On February 22, Portland finished their final home and preseason match with a defeat against New England Revolution with a final score of 1–3.  The lone scorer was Diego Chará in the 29th minute.  During the same day, Portland acquired $165,000 in General Allocation Money from Vancouver Whitecaps FC in exchange for a 2020 international roster slot.

On February 25, Portland signed right back Chris Duvall.

On February 26, Portland announced that they signed forward, Jeremy Ebobisse to a multi-year contract extension.

February
On February 29, the 2020 MLS Season officially began.

March
On March 1, Portland began their 2020 MLS campaign by hosting Minnesota United FC.  The Timbers Army raised their "Legends of Goose Hollow" tifo.  Portland lost with a final score of 1–3 with Diego Valeri successfully converting a penalty in the 56th minute.

On March 7, Taylor Twellman reported Portland right-back Jorge Moreira sustained a leg injury that will likely require surgery.

On March 8, Portland captured their first victory of the season by defeating Nashville SC with a final score of 1–0.  The lone scorer was Diego Valeri (assisted by: Andy Polo) in the 12th minute.  Steve Clark captured his first clean sheet of the season.

On March 9, Portland forward Jeremy Ebobisse was selected on the United States Under-23 national team roster for 2020 Olympic qualifying which will take place in Guadalajara, Mexico from March 20 – April 1. Dario Župarić and Steve Clark were awarded a spot on MLS Team of the Week: Week 2.

On March 12, Major League Soccer announced a 30-day suspension of the league in wake of the COVID-19 pandemic.

On March 19, Major League Soccer extended the league suspension until at least May 19, 2020 in accordance with CDC guidance on COVID-19.

April
On April 17, Major League Soccer further extended the league suspension due to COVID-19 until at least June 8, 2020.

May
On May 1, Major League Soccer announced that players are cleared to start voluntary individual workouts beginning on May 6.

On May 19, Major League Soccer announced the cancellation of the MLS All-Star Game, Leagues Cup, and Campeones Cup for 2020 due to the COVID-19 pandemic.  Due to this decision, Portland will not take part in the Leagues Cup this year.

On May 20, midfielder Dairon Asprilla undergoes successful arthroscopic meniscus repair procedure. He is expected to be out for five to six months.

On May 30, Major League Soccer announced that clubs can begin voluntary small group training sessions.

June
On June 4, Major League Soccer announced that clubs can return to full team training.

On June 10, Major League Soccer announced the start of play again, starting with a World Cup style tournament with wins that will count toward the regular season, which will begin after the tournament.

On June 11, Portland was drawn into Group F of the MLS is Back tournament, along with Los Angeles FC, LA Galaxy, and Houston Dynamo.

On June 18, Portland declined a permanent transfer option included in the loan agreement on right-back Jorge Moreira. He will return to Superliga Argentina side River Plate as his loan is now over.  Shortly after, Portland announced the signing of Venezuelan right back Pablo Bonilla from its USL Championship affiliate Portland Timbers 2.

On June 22, Portland signed defender Zac McGraw who was selected by the Timbers as the 68th overall 2020 SuperDraft pick earlier this year.

On June 28, Edgar "RCTID Thiago" Guerrero, Portland Timbers' eMLS competitor, lost a 2-1 battle to the LA Galaxy's Giuseppe "Godfather" Guastella Sunday in the Knockout Round of the 2020 eMLS Cup.

July
On July 6, Major League Soccer announced the revised 2020 transfer windows due to the impact of COVID-19.  A two-day transfer window from July 6 through July 7 and a secondary transfer window from August 12 – October 29.

On July 8, the MLS is Back Tournament officially began.

On July 9, Portland acquired a later MLS SuperDraft pick from Real Salt Lake in exchange for Portland Timber 2 forward Ryan Sierakowski. The draft pick is Real Salt Lake's 2023 fourth-round selection unless Sierakowski signs an MLS contract with Real Salt Lake. In that case, the pick is conveyed as Real Salt Lake's second-round pick in the subsequent season of his signing.

On July 13, Portland defeated LA Galaxy 2–1. The goal scorers were Jeremy Ebobisse in the 59th minute (assisted by: Sebastián Blanco and Diego Valeri) and Sebastián Blanco in the 66th minute. This puts Portland first in Group F at the end of the first round.

On July 18, Portland defeated Houston Dynamo with a final score of 2–1. The goal scorers were Jeremy Ebobisse (assisted by: Sebastián Blanco) in the 35th minute and Diego Valeri (assisted by: Eryk Williamson and Larrys Mabiala) in the 61st minute. With this win, Portland is guaranteed to advance to the Round of 16.

On July 23, Portland drew Los Angeles FC to a final result of 2–2. The goal scorers were Jarosław Niezgoda (assisted by: Sebastián Blanco and Marvin Loría) in the 7th minute.  This marks his first goal for the club and MLS. The final goal was scored by Jeremy Ebobisse (assisted by: Bill Tuiloma) in the 81st minute. With LA Galaxy and Houston Dynamo also ending with a draw, Portland claims first place in Group F and will face Group E second place club FC Cincinnati on July 28.

On July 28, Portland drew with FC Cincinnati 1–1. Portland won 4–2 on penalties. The lone goalscorer was Jaroslaw Niezgoda (assisted by: Sebastián Blanco) in the 67th minute.  Portland will face New York City FC in the quarterfinals on August 1.

August
On August 1, Portland defeated New York City FC in the quarterfinals 3–1. The goal scorers are Sebastián Blanco in the 43rd minute, Diego Valeri (assisted by: Jaroslaw Niezgoda) in the 65th minute, and Andy Polo (assisted by: Sebastián Blanco) in the 76th minute.  Portland now advance to the semi-finals where they take on Philadelphia Union on August 5.  This match also marks the 300th appearance for defensive midfielder, Diego Chará; Portland's longest signed player since signing with the club at the start of MLS play in 2011.

On August 5, Portland defeated Philadelphia Union in the semifinals 2–1.  The goal scorers are Jeremy Ebobisse (assisted by: Diego Valeri) in the 13th minute and Sebastián Blanco (assisted by: Dario Župarić and Dario Župarić) in the 70th minute.  Portland advances to the final to play Orlando City SC on August 11.

On August 8, Major League Soccer announced the first re-opening league schedules for all clubs.

On August 11, Portland won the MLS is Back Tournament with a final score of 2–1.  The goal scorers were Larrys Mabiala (assisted by: Diego Valeri) in the 27th minute and Dario Župarić (assisted by: Jeremy Ebobisse, Eryk Williamson) in the 66th minute.  With this win, Portland secures a berth in the 2021 CONCACAF Champions League.

On August 13, Sebastián Blanco was awarded Player of the Tournament for MLS is Back Tournament.  He took home 40.86 percent of the weighted media and fan vote, narrowly edging out Orlando City captain Nani's 37.54 percent.  Later that day, Major League Soccer announced the tournament's Best XI.  Included in the XI were Portland's Jeremy Ebobisse, Sebastián Blanco, Larrys Mabiala, and Diego Chará.

On August 14, goalkeeper Steve Clark won MLS is Back Tournament's Save of the Tournament while midfielder Andy Polo won MLS is Back Tournament's Goal of the Tournament. U.S. Soccer announced the official cancellation of the 2020 U.S. Open Cup.

On August 23, Portland resumed regular season play against rival Seattle Sounders FC.  Portland was defeated with a final score of 0–3.

On August 29, Portland drew Real Salt Lake at home with a final score of 4–4.  The goal scorers were Diego Chará in the 6th minute.  Jarosław Niezgoda (assisted by: Diego Valeri) in the 21st minute.  Sebastián Blanco (assisted by: Jeremy Ebobisse) in the 70th minute.  Felipe Mora (assisted by: Sebastián Blanco) in the 85th minute.

September
On September 2, Portland lost at home to LA Galaxy with a final score of 2–3.  The goal scorers were Felipe Mora in the 67th minute and Diego Valeri (assisted by: Yimmi Chará, Sebastián Blanco) in the 90th +2

On September 6, Portland defeated Seattle Sounders FC at CenturyLink Field with a final score of 2–1.  The goal scorers were Eryk Williamson (assisted by: Diego Valeri) in the 9th minute and Felipe Mora (assisted by: Eryk Williamson) in the 83rd minute.

On September 8, Portland announced that Sebastián Blanco will miss the remainder of the season due to torn ACL.

On September 11, Portland announced more matches for the month of September.

On September 13 Portland lost on the road to Los Angeles FC with a final score of 4–2.  The goal scorers were Eryk Williamson (assisted by: Felipe Mora and Diego Valeri) in the 25th minute and Jeremy Ebobisse
(assisted by: Jorge Villafaña) in the 45+2 minute.

On September 16, Portland drew San Jose Earthquakes away with a final score of 1–1.  The lone goal scorer was Yimmi Chará (assisted by: Diego Chará) in the 33rd minute.  This is the first time in club history that brothers were able to do an assist and a goal.

On September 19, Portland secured a dominated win over San Jose Earthquakes away with a final score of 6–1.  The goal scorers were Diego Valeri (penalty kick) in the 25th minute. Jeremy Ebobisse (assisted by: Jorge Villafaña) in the 27th minute. Diego Valeri (assisted by: Diego Chará) in the 57th minute.  Yimmi Chará in the 70th minute.  Julio Cascante (assisted by: Diego Valeri) in the 85th minute.  Finally, Jaroslaw Niezgoda (assisted by: Diego Chará) in the 87th minute.

On September 21, Diego Valeri was named Player of the Week for Week 12.

On September 22, Major League Soccer reviled the remaining matches for all teams for the 2020 season.

On September 23, Portland defeated their rival, Seattle Sounders FC to a final score of 2–1 at home.  The lone goalscorer was Yimmi Chará (assisted by: Jeremy Ebobisse) in the 13th minute.

On September 27, Portland played Vancouver Whitecaps at Providence Park but due to the border issues caused by COVID-19, Portland acted as the away team.  Portland won with a final score of 1–0 with the lone goal scorer being Felipe Mora (assisted by: Eryk Williamson) in the 5th minute.

October
On October 3, Portland's match against Colorado Rapids was suspended due to Colorado players and staff reporting cases of COVID-19.

Team kits
Supplier: Adidas / Sponsor: Alaska Air

Coaching staff and front office

Executive staff

Coaching staff

Stadiums

Squad information

First team

 

 (HG) = Homegrown Player
 (GA) = Generation Adidas Player
 (DP) = Designated Player
 (INT) = Player using International Roster Slot
 (L) = On Loan to the Timbers
 (LO) = Loaned out to another club
 (SEIL) = Season-ending Injury List

Second team

eMLS team

Competitions

Competitions overview
{| class="wikitable" style="text-align: center"
|-
!rowspan=2|Competition
!colspan=8|Record
!Start Round
!First Match
!Last Match
!Final Position (Conference)
|-
!
!
!
!
!
!
!
!
!colspan=4|
|-
| MLS is Back Tournament

|Group Stage
|July 13, 2020
|August 11, 2020
|Winners
|-
| Major League Soccer

|1
|March 1, 2020
|November 8, 2020
|TBD (TBD Western)
|-
| MLS Cup Playoffs

|TBD
|TBD
|TBD
|TBD
|-
| U.S. Open Cup

|Cancelled
|N/A
|N/A
|N/A
|-
| Leagues Cup

|Cancelled
|N/A
|N/A
|N/A
|-
! Total

!colspan=4|

Major League Soccer

Preseason

Costa Rica

Portland tournament

Standings

MLS is Back Tournament

Group F matches
Note: Group matches will count as points towards the regular season.

Group f standings

Knockout stage

MLS Regular season

Western Conference

Overall standings

Matches

The 2020 MLS schedule was released on December 19, 2019.

The reopening league schedule was released on August 8, 2020.

The league announced more matches for the month of September on September 8, 2020.

The league announced the remaining matches for the 2020 season on September 22, 2020.

Results by round

Results by location

Cascadia Cup

The Cascadia Cup Council decided that 2020 matches not played in front of supporters, including the MLS is Back Tournament, would not count towards Cascadia Cup standings.

Standings

MLS Cup Playoffs

U.S. Open Cup

The 2020 U.S. Open Cup was cancelled on August 14 due to the COVID-19 Pandemic.

Leagues Cup

Player and staff transactions
Per league and club policy, terms of the deals are not disclosed except Targeted Allocation Money, General Allocation Money, draft picks, and international rosters spots.

Transfers in

Loans in

Loans out

Transfers out

Contract extensions

2019 MLS Re-Entry Draft picks

2020 MLS SuperDraft picks

 

Round 2

Staff in

Staff out

Staff extensions

National Team participation

2020 MLS All-Star participation

Honors and awards

MLS is Back Tournament Best XI

MLS Player of the Tournament

MLS Goal of the Tournament

MLS Save of the Tournament

MLS Player of the Week

MLS Goal of the Week

MLS Team of the Week

Statistics

Appearances and discipline
Numbers in parentheses denote appearances as a substitute.

(T2) = Players called up from Portland Timbers 2 for short-term contracts.

Goalkeeper stats
The list is sorted by total minutes played then by jersey number.

Top scorers
The list is sorted by shirt number when total goals are equal.

Top assists
The list is sorted by shirt number when total assists are equal.

Shutouts
The list is sorted by shirt number when total clean sheets are equal.

Summary

References

Portland Timbers (MLS) seasons
Portland
Portland Timbers
Portland Timbers
Portland Timbers